Zumratjon Nazarova (born 27 May 1992) is an Uzbekistani footballer who plays as a defender for Women's Championship club Bunyodkor. She is also a futsal player, and represented Uzbekistan internationally in both football and futsal.

Club career
Nazarova has played for Bunyodkor in Uzbekistan.

International career
Nazarova has been capped for Uzbekistan at senior level in both football and futsal. In football, she represented Uzbekistan at the 2016 AFC Women's Olympic Qualifying Tournament and the 2018 AFC Women's Asian Cup qualification.

In futsal, Nazarova played for Uzbekistan at the 2018 AFC Women's Futsal Championship.

International goals
Scores and results list Uzbekistan's goal tally first

References

1992 births
Living people
People from Namangan Region
Uzbekistani women's footballers
Women's association football defenders
Uzbekistan women's international footballers
Uzbekistani women's futsal players
20th-century Uzbekistani women
21st-century Uzbekistani women